Modoc may refer to:

Ethnic groups
Modoc people, a Native American/First Nations people
Modoc language
Modoc Tribe of Oklahoma, a federally recognized tribe of Modoc
Modoc War, the last armed resistance of the Modoc people in 1873
The "Modocs", rival gang to the Molly Maguires

Places in the US
Modoc, Arkansas
Modoc, Georgia
Modoc, Illinois
Modoc, Indiana
Modoc, Kansas
Modoc, South Carolina
Modoc County, California
Modoc Crater, a volcanic feature in Lava Beds National Monument
Modoc National Forest, in northeastern California
Modoc Plateau, in California, Oregon, and Nevada
Modoc Point, a cliff in Klamath County, Oregon
Modoc Point, Oregon, a community named after the cliff

Vessels
USCGC Modoc (WPG-46), a Tampa-class Coast Guard cutter
USS Modoc (1865), a Casco-class light draft monitor
Modoc (YT-16), a 1890 US Navy yard tug

Other uses
MODOC, the original alias of MODOK in the works of Marvel Comics
Modoc cypress (Cupressus bakeri), a tree species native to the homeland of the Modoc people
Modoc sucker, an endangered California fish
Modoc (novel), a 1998 novel by Ralph Helfer (1897–1975)
MODOC, an acronym for the Missouri Department of Corrections
"Modoc", a 1989 song from High Tension Wires by Steve Morse